Lim Chan Yew (born 14 October 1978 in Malaysia) is a Malaysian retired footballer.

On 4 August 2001, he played in 2001 Sultan of Selangor Cup.

He also the former member of Malaysia national team.

Honours
Selangor
Malaysia Cup: 2002

Negeri Sembilan
Malaysia FA Cup: 2003

References

Malaysian footballers
Living people
Association football defenders
1978 births
Malaysian sportspeople of Chinese descent
Malaysia international footballers